The Rt Hon. John Robert William Vesey, 4th Viscount de Vesci, 5th Baron Knapton and 1st Baron de Vesci (21 May 1844 – 6 July 1903), "Yvo", was an Anglo-Irish peer and British Army officer.

Biography
He was the eldest son and heir of the 3rd Viscount de Vesci (d. 1875) by his wife, Lady Emma Herbert (1819–1884), youngest daughter of the 11th Earl of Pembroke. In 1863, he was commissioned into the Coldstream Guards. He was promoted to captain in 1866, and to lieutenant colonel in 1876. On 23 December 1875, he succeeded to his father's titles in the Peerage of Ireland. Lord de Vesci retired from the army in 1883. On 8 November 1884, he was created Baron de Vesci, of Abbey Leix in the Queen's County, in the Peerage of the United Kingdom, thus giving him an hereditary seat in the House of Lords. Between 1883 and 1900, he served as Lord Lieutenant of Queen's County.

Marriage and children

On 4 June 1872 he married Lady Evelyn Charteris, eldest daughter of the 10th Earl of Wemyss by his wife, Lady Anne Frederica Anson, by whom he had one daughter and sole heiress:
Hon. Mary Gertrude Vesey (10 April 1889 – 28 November 1970), who married Hon. Aubrey Herbert (1880-1923) of Pixton Park in Somerset, second son of the 4th Earl of Carnarvon. She died at Pixton, as is recorded on her brass memorial tablet in the Herbert Chapel, Brushford Church, Somerset.

Death and succession
He died in 1903 leaving no sons, so his British peerage became extinct, while his Irish titles were inherited by his nephew, Yvo Vesey, 5th Viscount de Vesci.

References

1844 births
1903 deaths
19th-century Anglo-Irish people
Coldstream Guards officers
Irish officers in the British Army
Lord-Lieutenants of Queen's County
Viscounts in the Peerage of Ireland
Peers of the United Kingdom created by Queen Victoria